Caring for the Lagoon is a documentary directed by Oliver Dickinson about how the Mahorans of Mayotte are trying to preserve their lagoon.

The film has been selected by numerous festivals throughout the world (i.e. Al Jazeera Documentary Film Festival, Kuala Lumpur Eco Film festival, Roshd International Film Festival, Ménigoute Wildlife Film Festival) and has won many awards (i.e. Grand Prix of Ecology at the Warsaw FilmAT Festival 2012, Best Ecology Film Award at the Silver Lake International Film Festival 2011, Cousteau Award at the Ecollywood Film Festival 2011).

See also
 Ecology
 Biodiversity
 Sustainable development
 Mozambique Channel
 Indian Ocean

External links
 
 

2011 films
British documentary films
French documentary films
Documentary films about water and the environment
2011 documentary films
Films set in Mayotte
Films directed by Oliver Dickinson
2010s British films
2010s French films